István Almási (12 July 1944 – 20 November 2017) was a Hungarian teacher and politician who served as mayor of Hódmezővásárhely from 2012 until his death in 2017.

Almási died while in office on 20 November 2017, at the age of 73.

Personal life
He was married to Enikő Sáfár with whom he had three children – a daughter, Enikő and two sons, Attila and Zoltán.

References

1944 births
2017 deaths
Mayors of places in Hungary
Christian Democratic People's Party (Hungary) politicians
People from Békés County